Glenrock is a rural locality in the South Burnett Region, Queensland, Australia. In the  Glenrock had a population of 40 people.

History 
Glenrock State School opened on 15 April 1926 and closed on 1966.

In the  Glenrock had a population of 40 people.

References 

South Burnett Region
Localities in Queensland